Kalyan Manikya (d. 1660) was the Maharaja of Tripura from 1626 to 1660. Reigning in the aftermath of an occupation by the Mughal Empire, Kalyan did much to restore the kingdom, though it remained in a continuous state of war with the Mughals.

Reign
Kalyan was born into a branch of the Manikya dynasty, with his father Kachu Fa being a descendant of Gagan Fa, himself a son of Maha Manikya. Upon the capture of Tripura by the Mughals in 1618, Yashodhar Manikya, prior to his expulsion from the kingdom, named Kalyan his heir, due to the former's lack of close male relatives. Following the Mughal's retreat after a deadly epidemic in the region, the Tripuri nobles appointed Kalyan as the new ruler in 1626, confirming his previous nomination.

During his reign, Kalyan extensively worked to restore order to the kingdom. The administration was reorganised and improvements were made to the military, allowing the recapture of previously lost territory. He was also devoted to religious pursuits, having constructed a temple to Kali as well as donating lands to Brahmins.

Like his predecessor, Kalyan refused to pay tribute to the Mughals, resulting in repeated attacks against the kingdom, which he was initially able to repulse. However, he was ultimately defeated by Prince Shah Shuja in 1658. Tripura was subsequently added to the Mughal revenue roll under the name "Sarkar Udaipur" and Kalyan was required to give up his son Nakshatra Roy (later known as Chhatra Manikya) as a hostage to Shuja's court.

After his death in 1660, Tripura, already weakened by war, was further subjected to a fratricidal succession struggle amongst Kalyan's sons.

References

Kings of Tripura
History of Tripura
1660 deaths